Andre Joseph Barbe (July 27, 1923 – January 15, 2004) was a Canadian professional ice hockey right winger who played in one National Hockey League game for the Toronto Maple Leafs during the 1950–51 season. The rest of his career, which lasted from 1944 to 1955, was spent in the minor leagues.

Career statistics

Regular season and playoffs

See also
 List of players who played only one game in the NHL

External links
 

1923 births
2004 deaths
Canadian ice hockey right wingers
Ice hockey people from Ontario
Los Angeles Monarchs players
Oakland Oaks (PCHL) players
Pittsburgh Hornets players
Sportspeople from Greater Sudbury
Toronto Maple Leafs players